303 Creative LLC v. Elenis (Docket 21–476) is a pending United States Supreme Court case related to the conflict between LGBT rights in public accommodations and the First Amendment to the United States Constitution.

Background 
Lorie Smith is a website designer, running her business as 303 Creative, LLC. registered in Colorado. Smith had been developing websites for others and wanted to move into making wedding announcement websites. Smith claims it would have been against her Christian faith to make sites for non-heterosexual marriages. She wanted to post a notice on her business website to notify users of her unwillingness to create websites promoting same-sex marriages, and instead would refer gay patrons to other potential designers who may provide services to them.

Before implementing the notice, Smith discovered that such a notice would violate the Colorado anti-discrimination state laws that were amended in 2008, which prevent public businesses from discriminating against gay people, as well as making statements to that effect. Smith, represented by the Alliance Defending Freedom, sued Colorado in 2016 in the United States District Court for the District of Colorado, seeking to block enforcement of the anti-discrimination law. The district court waited for the result of the 2018 Supreme Court case Masterpiece Cakeshop v. Colorado Civil Rights Commission which dealt with the same anti-discrimination law. As Masterpiece was ruled on narrow procedural grounds, finding that the Colorado agency that ruled against Phillips were unfairly hostile to his religious beliefs, the district court ruled against Smith in 2019. At that time, Colorado had not investigated Smith and there was no evidence that she had engaged in discrimination

Smith appealed to the United States Court of Appeals for the Tenth Circuit, which upheld the district court decision in a 2–1 ruling. In the majority ruling, the Tenth Circuit held the anti-discrimination law satisfied strict scrutiny under the First Amendment to the United States Constitution, deepening a circuit split with decisions issued by the Arizona Supreme Court and the United States Court of Appeals for the Eighth Circuit. Chief Judge Timothy Tymkovich dissented in the Tenth's decision, writing "the majority takes the remarkable — and novel — stance that the government may force Ms. Smith to produce messages that violate her conscience."

Supreme Court 

Smith filed a petition for a writ of certiorari, which the Supreme Court granted in February 2022. While the petition asked whether Employment Division v. Smith should be overruled, the Supreme Court limited the case to the question of whether Colorado's law violates the Free Speech Clause of the First Amendment. Unlike the previous decision in Masterpiece, where the court had a 5-4 majority of conservative justices, 303 Creative was heard under a 6-3 conservative majority following the retirement of Anthony Kennedy and death of Ruth Bader Ginsburg, replaced with Justices Brett Kavanaugh and Amy Coney Barrett, respectively. This new court has been seen as more favorable to religious rights based on several key cases decided during previous terms. 

About 75 amicus briefs were submitted prior to oral hearings. Among those supporting Smith include 20 conservative-leaning states, law professors, several religious organizations, and libertarian leaning think tanks such as the Americans for Prosperity Foundation and the Cato Institute. Those supporting the state of Colorado include twenty other liberal states, the Biden administration, several law professors, and liberal-leaning groups such as Public Citizen, the American Civil Liberties Union, and the NAACP Legal Defense Fund. 

Oral hearings were held on December 5, 2022. Court observers believed the conservative majority would favor Smith in that she should not be compelled to write speech against her faith, but were concerned about where to draw a line so that other anti-discrimination laws would not be affected by their decision.

See also
Jones v. Alfred H. Mayer Co., private discrimination case based on race
Public accommodations in the United States

References

2023 in United States case law
United States Supreme Court cases
United States Supreme Court cases of the Roberts Court
United States Free Speech Clause case law
United States LGBT rights case law
Discrimination against LGBT people in the United States
LGBT in Colorado